Arfak Mountains Regency (Kabupaten Pegunungan Arfak) is a regency of the West Papua Province of Indonesia. It was formed in 2013 from the western districts of Manokwari Regency. The areas now comprised in the new regency had a population of 23,877 at the 2010 Census, which rose to 38,941 at the 2020 Census. The administrative centre is the town of Anggi.

Geography
Geographical Location of Arfak Mountains Regency, as follows: Part North : 0º55' South Latitude; Southern Part: 1º40' South Latitude; Part West : 133º10' East Longitude; East: 134º05' East Longitude. The altitude of the Arfak Mountains Regency is 300 – 1,800 meters above sea level. In terms of area by district, see Table below.

Administration
The Arfak Mountains Regency is divided into ten districts (distrik), listed below with their areas and their populations at the 2010 Census and the 2020 Census. The table also includes the location of the district administrative centres, the number of administrative villages (rural desa and urban kelurahan) in each district, and its post code.

References

External links
Statistics publications from Statistics Indonesia (BPS)

Regencies of West Papua (province)